Oliver Köhrmann (born 26 or 28 July 1976) is a German handball player. He was born in Oldenburg. He competed at the 2008 Summer Olympics in Beijing, where the German team placed 9th.

References

External links

1976 births
Living people
Sportspeople from Oldenburg
German male handball players
Olympic handball players of Germany
Handball players at the 2008 Summer Olympics